Volkan Ekici (born 23 March 1991 in Lünen, North Rhine-Westphalia, Germany) is a Turkish professional footballer who currently plays as a midfielder for Lüner SV of the Landesliga 3 Westfalen in Germany.

Life and career
Ekici began his career with Borussia Dortmund in 2000. He was transferred to Beşiktaş J.K. in 2010. He made his professional debut on 21 May 2011 against Gaziantepspor.

On 16 August 2011, he joined Kartalspor on a loan for the 2011-12 campaign but his contract was mutually terminated on 11 January 2012 without having played for the first team at all. On 16 January 2012, he was released from his contract with Beşiktaş as well and on 31 January 2012, he joined Göztepe on a 3.5-year deal.

References

External links
 

1991 births
Living people
Turkish footballers
Beşiktaş J.K. footballers
Kartalspor footballers
Association football midfielders